(born 1958 in Himeji) is a Japanese anime critic and writer.

Overview 
He has hosted the TV program  on NHK, and the Totte Oki A-News anime news program on Animax.

External links 
  Ryusuke Hiakawa Homepage 
  Japan’s Anime Culture by Ryusuke Hikawa

1958 births
Living people
Japanese critics
People from Himeji, Hyōgo
20th-century Japanese people
21st-century Japanese people